The Slovak 2. Liga (English:Slovak Second League), also known as the 2. Liga or the 2HL, is currently the third tier of ice hockey in Slovakia. For the 2018–19 season, the 2. liga is divided into two different divisions. It lies below the Slovak Extraliga and the Slovak 1. Liga. The league is composed of 14 teams divided into two groups, whose teams are divided geographically (Western and Eastern).

Teams 2022-23

Western division

Eastern division

Champions
Note: Bold indicates overall champion.
 2018–19 : HK Levice (Western), HKM Rimavská Sobota (Eastern)
 2017–18 : MHK-Martin (Western), MHK Humenné (Eastern)
 2016–17 : MHK Dubnica nad Vahom (Western), MHK Humenné (Eastern)
 2015–16 : HK 96 Nitra (Western), MHk 32 Liptovský Mikuláš B (Eastern)
 2014–15 : HC Mikron Nové Zámky (Western), MHK Bemaco Humenné (Eastern)
 2013–14 : MHK Dubnica (Western), MHK Bemaco Humenné (Eastern)
 2012–13 : HK Dynamax Nitra (Western), MŠK Hviezda Dolný Kubín (Eastern)
 2011–12 : HK Iskra Partizánske (Western), HKM Rimavská Sobota (Eastern)
 2010–11 : HK Dynamax Nitra (Western), HK Púchov (Central), MHK Ružomberok (Eastern)
 2009–10 : HK Dynamax Nitra (Western), HK Púchov (Central), HKM Rimavská Sobota (Eastern)
 2008–09 : HK Brezno (Eastern), HK Púchov (Western)
 2007–08 : HC 07 Detva (Eastern), HK Púchov (Western)
 2006–07 : HC 46 Bardejov (Eastern), ŠK Matterhorn Púchov (Western)
 2005–06 : HK Ružinov 99 Bratislava (Western), MHK SkiPark Kežmarok (Eastern)
 2004–05 : HKm Humenné (Eastern), HK Lokomotíva Nové Zámky (Western)
 2003–04 : HK Trnava (Western), HK Brezno (Eastern)
 2002–03 : HK Brezno (Eastern), ŠHK 37 Piešťany (Western)
 2001–02 : HK Ružinov 99 Bratislava (Western), HK 32 Liptovský Mikuláš B (Eastern)
 2000–01 : Považská Bystrica (Western), HKm Detva (Central), HK Spisska Nova Ves B (Eastern)
 1999–2000 : Považská Bystrica (Western), HK VTJ Wagon Slovakia Trebišov (Eastern)
 1998–99 : Považská Bystrica
 1997–98 : KĽŠ Spartak Trnava (Western), HKm Zvolen B (Central), HKm Humenné (Eastern)
 1996–97 : Retir Sľažany (Western), HK Slovan Trstená (Central), HK VTJ Wagon Slovakia Trebišov (Eastern)
 1995–96 : Spartak BEZ Bratislava (Western), HK Medokýš Turčianske Teplice (Central), HK Agro White Lady Levoča (Eastern)
 1994–95 : Spartak BEZ Bratislava (Western), HK Medokýš Turčianske Teplice (Central), HC Compact Rožňava (Eastern)
 1993–94 : HC Univerzita Bratislava (Western), ŠK Matador Púchov (Central), HC Compact Rožňava (Eastern)

See also
 Slovak Extraliga
 1. liga

References

External links
SZĽH – Slovak Ice-Hockey Federation 
 – 2. Hokejova liga statistics 

 
Slov
1993 establishments in Slovakia
Sports leagues established in 1993
Professional ice hockey leagues in Slovakia
Multi-national ice hockey leagues in Europe
Multi-national professional sports leagues